Syberia is a franchise of graphic adventure games created by Belgian comic artist and video game developer Benoît Sokal. Set within an alternate universe designed by Sokal and introduced in the 1999 video game Amerzone, the series is currently developed and published by French video game company Microids. The central focus of the franchise, beginning with the eponymous 2002 video game, follows the experiences of Kate Walker, an American adventurer who originally worked as a lawyer in a prominent New York City law firm. In each installment, Walker travels to various fictional locations in continental Europe and former Soviet states during the 2000s, where she encounters fantastical creatures as well as highly advanced automatons powered by intricate clockwork mechanisms.

The first Syberia centers on Walker's efforts to locate and deal with the eccentric inventor Hans Voralberg on behalf of her firm to secure the purchase of his family's factory. By the events of Syberia II, Walker abandons her assignment and accompanies Voralberg in his search for the legendary island of Syberia, which is said to be home to the last surviving mammoths of the world. The franchise features a cast of secondary characters, including Oscar, one of Voralberg's sentient automatons, and Dana Roze, an aspiring pianist introduced in the 2022 video game Syberia: The World Before. Members of a nomadic tribal people indigenous to the geographical area of Siberia known as the Youkols also play an important role in the lore and setting of the series, which combines realistic and surrealistic elements for its tone.

The first two Syberia titles has been commercially successful, with lifetime sales reaching 3 million worldwide by 2016. Both titles have been ported or re-released on multiple platforms ever since their original launches in the early 2000s. Amerzone, the predecessor of the first two Syberia titles, also saw critical and commercial success, especially in France. Syberia 3 was released in 2017 to a mediocre critical reception. The World Before launched for PC platforms on March 18, 2022, with console platforms due for release at a later date.

Games

Amerzone  was first released for PC platforms in 1999. The player assumes the role of a journalist who interviews an elderly French explorer Alexandre Valembois in 1999, though much of the plot explores the backstory of Valembois's 1932 expedition to the fictional South American country of Amerzone. While not bearing the series title, it takes place in the same setting as the later games in the series.
Syberia, the first entry in the series proper, was released for Windows in several territories throughout 2002. It follows Kate Walker, an American lawyer tasked with overseeing the successful financial transaction of an automaton factory owned by the Voralberg family in the fictional European city of Valadilene. This title is later ported to multiple console and mobile platforms across console generations since its original release.
Syberia II was released for Windows between March to May 2004 in North America and Europe, and for the PlayStation and Xbox later that year. It continues the story of the first Syberia and follows Kate Walker, who abandons her career and the opportunity to return to the United States, as she accompanies the last surviving member of the Voralberg family in his search for the legendary island of Syberia. Like its predecessor, Syberia II has been ported to numerous platforms since its original PC release.
Syberia 3 saw a multiplatform release for Windows, OS X, PlayStation 4 & Xbox One. It launched in Europe in April 21, 2017, and for North America in April 25, 2017. It continues Kate Walker's story arc following the conclusion of Syberia II and her subsequent departure from the island of Syberia. She  joins the Youkol tribe in their traditional migratory journey as she attempts to evade her pursuers. 
Syberia: The World Before launched worldwide on March 18, 2022 for Windows. It features two main player characters: Dana Roze in the late 1930s, an aspiring pianist and member of a persecuted European ethnic minority; and Kate Walker in 2004, who is forced into indentured servitude at a salt mine following her capture in Syberia 3.

Compilations 
Syberia Collector's Edition I & II is a compilation of the first two Syberia titles. It was released on April 7, 2008 for PC platforms and PlayStation 3.
Syberia Collection is a compilation which consists of remastered versions of the first two Syberia games as well as Amerzone. It was meant to be the first pack in the "Adventure Classics" branding used by publisher Iceberg Interactive. It was released for PC platforms on October 30, 2009. A similarly named compilation for the PlayStation 3, which only collects the first two Syberia titles, was offered as a free PlayStation Plus game for December 2017.
Syberia 1 & 2 is a compilation of the first two Syberia titles for the Nintendo Switch. It was released on November 8, 2018.
Syberia Trilogy collects the first three games of the franchise as a physical release. It was released on October 31, 2019 for the Nintendo Switch.

Development
The Syberia universe is created and designed by Belgian comic artist and video game developer Benoît Sokal. Each installment in the series has been developed and published by Microids. The development team originally considered developing a single game for Syberia, but decided to develop two separate titles due to the large scope of the project as envisioned by Sokal.

Adaptations
Syberia was first adapted into the comic book format in 2017, with the release of a two-volume graphic novel published by Belgian publisher Le Lombard. It serves as a prelude to the video game series' third installment and offers an "alternative version" of the first game's story, which is centered on Hans Voralberg's backstory as a child in the distant past, with interspersed scenes depicting Kate Walker in the 2000s. The first issue was released on April 20, 2017, and the second issue on October 18, 2017. Sokal and his son Hugo were credited as scriptwriters, with art provided by Johann Blais.

Reception and critical response

Amerzone was a surprise commercial success. Following its release in France in March 1999, it sold 10,000 units by early May. By June 1999, GameSpot UK concluded that Amerzone had become a "big hit in France". The game generated lifetime sales of 1.5 million copies by 2013.

The first two Syberia titles have been successful commercially and critically. The first Syberia surpassed 225,000 units in sales by February 2003, and had achieved nearly 350,000 global sales across its console and computer versions by September 2003. In France, the Agence française pour le jeu vidéo reported that Syberias computer release had sold 50,000 units by September 2003. According to Michel Bams of Sokal's White Birds Productions, it reached "nearly 500,000 copies" in global sales that February, a number it surpassed by late 2005, according to Ubisoft. By 2006, Syberias sales in the United States reached 161,000 units. Following its launch in March 2004, Syberia II reached sales of 215,000 copies in Europe and the United States combined two months later. Its PC version also saw some commercial success in Russia. By late 2005, Syberia II was on track to reach 600,000 sales overall, a number it had reached by March 2006. Worldwide sales of the overall Syberia series had topped 1 million units by 2008, and rose to 3 million by 2016, before the release of Syberia 3.

The first two Syberia titles received praise from critics following their initial launches, although reviews of console ports for the original Xbox and Nintendo Switch were less enthusiastic. The Nintendo DS and PlayStation 3 ports of the first Syberia in particular received criticism over significant technical issues or perceived quality. The third installment received an unfavorable critical reception, with a consensus among reviewers that it is not up to par with its predecessors in terms of overall quality. The World Before received generally positive reviews from reviewers, with some reviewers lauding the title as a return to form for the series.

References

Further reading

External links
Official Twitter account

Alternate history video games
Microïds games
Point-and-click adventure games
Steampunk video games
Syberia
Video game franchises
Video game franchises introduced in 1999
Video games adapted into comics
Video games developed in France
Video games featuring female protagonists
Video games set on fictional islands
Video games set in the Arctic
Video games set in Eastern Europe
Video games set in forests
Video games set in Europe
Video games set in Russia
Video games set in the 21st century
Video games set in South America